Glenea astathiformis is a species of beetle in the family Cerambycidae. It was described by Stephan von Breuning in 1958. It is known from Laos, India, China, and Nepal. It contains the varietas Glenea astathiformis var. viridicoerulea.

References

astathiformis
Beetles described in 1958